"Zzyzx Rd." is the fifth single from Stone Sour's second album Come What(ever) May. The two-track promo single for the song released strictly to radio in 2007.

Background

"Zzyzx Rd." is a love song written to Taylor's wife for helping him in his struggles against alcoholism and contemplation of suicide, a theme he returns to across the album.

Before the album tracklist was finalized, Corey Taylor mentioned the song in an interview with Revolver, saying:

Track listing

Chart positions

Personnel
Stone Sour
Corey Taylor – vocals, acoustic guitar, production
James Root – lead guitar, production
Josh Rand – rhythm guitar, production
Shawn Economaki – bass, production
Joel Ekman – drums, production
Additional personnel
 Rami Jaffee – piano

References

2007 singles
Stone Sour songs
2006 songs
Roadrunner Records singles
Songs written by Corey Taylor
Songs written by Roy Mayorga
Songs written by Josh Rand
Songs written by Jim Root
Song recordings produced by Nick Raskulinecz